Macrancylus linearis is a species of terrestrial beetle in family Curculionidae. It is believed to have originated in the Pacific, having been introduced in mainland USA. It is currently distributions includes Hawaii, Texas, Florida and the West Indies. The insect was found along shorelines, specifically in driftwood.

References 

Cossoninae
Beetles described in 1876
Taxonomy articles created by Polbot